HMRC Vigilant was an Isles-class naval trawler, formerly HMS Benbecula, acquired by the HM Customs and Excise in 1946, and fitted out for service with the Customs.

She took part in many clandestine operations in co-operation with the Investigations Branch of HM Customs and Excise, against smuggling. Initially, from 1947 until 1953, she was based in Gravesend Reach on the River Thames, commanded by Peter de Neumann.  In 1953 her base was moved to Southampton Water. Vigilant was ocean going and by far the largest vessel ever operated by HM Customs and Excise.  Her Commander and Chief Officer each had to hold Foreign-Going Master's certificates, as well as receiving HM Customs Commissions.  She sometimes voyaged to the fishing grounds of Newfoundland Banks, off Iceland, into the Baltic, and The North and Irish Seas.

The first ever live outside TV broadcast from a ship was made from her during the 1950 General Agreement on Tariffs and Trade (GATT) conference in Torquay.  Stafford Cripps, the then Chancellor of the Exchequer, lived and entertained aboard her during the conference.

References
 
 
 

Customs cutters of the United Kingdom
1943 ships